December is the fifth studio album by trumpet player Chris Botti. It was released by Columbia Records on October 22, 2002. Botti himself provided vocal on "Perfect Day".

Track listing

Personnel 
 Chris Botti – trumpet (1-13), arrangements (1, 3, 4, 5, 9, 11, 12, 13), string arrangements (1)
 Billy Childs – Fender Rhodes (1, 11, 13), acoustic piano (3, 4, 5, 9, 12), arrangements (4, 5, 12)
 C. J. Vanston – acoustic piano (3, 13), synthesizers (4, 5, 11, 12), organ (3), string arrangements (4), Hammond organ (9)
 Randy Waldman – acoustic piano (7, 8)
 Anthony Wilson – guitar (1, 3, 7, 9)
 Shane Fontayne – guitar (6, 11, 13), arrangements (6)
 James Harrah – guitar (8)
 Dave Carpenter – bass (1, 3, 5, 12)
 Jon Ossman – bass (6, 11, 13)
 Christian McBride – bass (7)
 Brian Bromberg – bass (8)
 Jimmy Haslip – bass (9)
 Peter Erskine – drums (1, 5, 9, 12), percussion (5, 9)
 Vinnie Colaiuta – drums (7, 8, 11, 13)
 Bob Sheppard – alto flute (1), tenor saxophone (9)
 Brandon Fields – tenor saxophone (11)
 Mary Anne Steinberger – cello (1, 4)
 Andrew Picken – viola (1, 4)
 Susan Chatman – violin (1, 4)
 Joel Derouin – violin (1, 4)
 Gina Kronstadt – violin (1, 4), concertmaster (1, 4)
 John Wittenberg – violin (1, 4)
 The London Session Orchestra – orchestra (2, 10)
 Jeremy Lubbock – arrangements (2, 7, 10)
 Gil Goldstein – arrangements (8)
 JoAnn Tominaga – contractor (8)
 Richard H. Bullock – bassoon (8)
 Andrew Radford – bassoon (8)
 Don Markese – clarinet (8)
 Stephen Kujala – flute (8)
 Dick Mitchell – flute (8)
 Robert Shulgold – flute (8)
 Justin Hagerman – flugelhorn (8)
 Yvonne Moriarty – flugelhorn (8)
 Brian O'Connor – flugelhorn (8)
 Kurt Snyder – flugelhorn (8)
 Nick Lane – trombone (8)
 John Van Houten – tuba (8)
 Orchestra of St John's – choir (2)
 John Lubbock – choir conductor (2)
 Eric Benét – vocals (7)

Production 
 Bobby Colomby – producer, management 
 Nathaniel Kunkel – engineer, mixing (1, 3, 5, 6, 9, 11, 12, 13)
 Christopher Roberts – additional engineer 
 Joe Brown, Jr. – second engineer 
 Charlie Paakkari – second engineer
 Haydn Bendell – recording (2, 10), mixing (2, 10)
 Al Schmitt – recording (7, 8), mixing (7, 8)
 Steve Hall – mastering at Future Disc (North Hollywood, California).
 Mary Maurer – art direction 
 Kevo Sassouni – design 
 Davis Factor – photography 
 Marc Silag – management

Charts

References

2002 Christmas albums
Chris Botti albums
Instrumental albums
Christmas albums by American artists
Jazz Christmas albums
Columbia Records Christmas albums
Albums produced by Bobby Colomby
Albums recorded at AIR Studios

Albums recorded at Capitol Studios